Tenzin Priyadarshi is the president and CEO of the Dalai Lama Center for Ethics and Transformative Values at the Massachusetts Institute of Technology.

Early years 
Priyadarshi was born into a Hindu Bhumihar Brahmin family in Vaishali district, Bihar, India. He comes from a family of bureaucrats, political leaders, and eminent scholars. He has two sisters, one is an attorney and the other, Shilpa Shukla, is a famed actress in the Indian film industry.

He entered the monastery at the age of ten in Rajgir, India near the ancient Nalanda University at his own volition.  He is a Buddhist monk from India ordained by the Dalai Lama, who is his preceptor and mentor.  He also studied under the guidance of Sakya Trizin, Drikung Chhetsang, Kushok Bakula Rinpoche and Samdhong Rinpoche, and received meditation training from Drubwang Rinpoche. Priyadarshi trained in India, Nepal, and Japan in Indo-Tibetan and Japanese Buddhism, and is known for his love of Sanskrit Buddhist literature. He also spent several years studying Vedanta and Kashmir Shaivism in Kolkata, and maintained close relations with the Ramakrishna Mission Ashram.

He attended Central Institute of Higher Tibetan Studies and the Sanskrit University in Varanasi, India, and graduated from Le Moyne College, Summa Cum Laude, with a bachelor's degree as an integral honors scholar studying philosophy, physics, and religious studies with minors in international relations and Japanese. In 2003 he completed his graduate studies in comparative philosophy of religion at Harvard University. In 2002 he was appointed as the first Buddhist chaplain at MIT.

Teaching career 
Priyadarshi lectures internationally on Buddhist philosophy, ethics, leadership, and socio-political issues.

In 2009, Priyadarshi founded the Dalai Lama Center for Ethics and Transformative Values at MIT to design and disseminate innovative programs on teaching secular ethics and human values. The decision to name this center was based on the Dalai Lama's commitment to human wellbeing and the fact that he was named as a top global leader in a survey in 2008. The Center for Ethics has 6 Nobel Peace Laureates as its founding members and its programs run in 5 countries while poised for a global reach.

Priyadarshi was also involved with designing a Vocal Vibrations exhibit with Tod Machover, Neri Oxman, and David Edwards.

He is regarded as an influential teacher in the Rimé (non-sectarian) movement within Tibetan Buddhism, like his predecessor. He founded the Prajnopaya Institute to create an avenue for critical study and practice of Buddhist philosophy within Europe and North America. To promote contemplative programs in North America, he founded Bodhimarga, a CyberDharma community with satellite locations in various parts of North America and Asia.

Ethics and empathy efforts 
In 2015, Priyadarshi became a Directors' Fellow at MIT Media Lab and directed the ethics initiative (2015-2019) to help foster critical conversations on ethics and emerging technologies with focus on AI and CRISPR in particular. Through this he made efforts to promote research and program design to facilitate broader and deeper understanding of ethics and empathy adherence. He coined the expression "ethics as optimization" to convey a distinctive approach to ethics learning. Turing Prize winner Edward Feigenbaum said that he was encouraged by this novel "ethics as optimization" approach to Cognitive Computing and AI as presented by Priyadarshi at a summit in Napa, California.

Priyadarshi along with Joi Ito and Reid Hoffman commenced plans to create Ethics and Governance of Artificial Intelligence Fund to promote ethical framework and transparency in AI related developments. The fund also explores AI for Social Good models. The fund is also supported by Pierre Omidyar and the Knight Foundation and others. Primary institutions overseeing this work are MIT Media Lab and the Berkman Klein Center for Internet & Society at Harvard University.

Speaking during a private gathering of lawmakers and business leaders, Priyadarshi suggested "lack of empathy as a public health issue." He encouraged the audience to begin thinking of nurturing ethics and empathy (as well as its "upgraded forms" such as kindness and compassion) as civic responsibility without which any democratic system is at threat. "Any systems thinker working on wellbeing of the individual, organizations and societies cannot ignore ethics and empathy framework," he proposed.

Conflict resolution and peace efforts 
Having been exposed to the dangers of religious fanaticism and violence early on, Priyadarshi has been instrumental in conflict resolution processes in India and Sri Lanka. He has been actively involved in inter-religious dialogue with religious leaders such as Pope John Paul II, Desmond Tutu, and Pope Benedict XVI. He has made his admiration for Francis of Assisi quite public and travels to Italy frequently to engage in spiritual dialogue with Christian monastic communities. He actively promotes contemplative learning beyond religious boundaries and talks frequently with Thomas Keating, founder of Contemplative Outreach. He received a Felicitation for his work at the 2007 SAARC Interfaith Conclave in New Delhi, India. He delivered the Reverend Daniel Berrigan SJ Peace Makers Lecture in 2013 at Le Moyne College, New York.  He also received the Distinguished Alumni Honors from Harvard University in April 2013 recognizing his contributions.

Humanitarian projects 
Following the disasters caused by the 2005 tsunami, Priyadarshi founded the Prajnopaya Foundation to develop innovative and sustainable ways to alleviate suffering in developing countries. The foundation has been active in health care endeavors in India, including systematic methods to curtail tuberculosis and bring health care to rural areas.

He was a project advisor to a team of architects from MIT, Harvard Graduate School of Design, and University of Cambridge to develop Tsunami Safe(r) Houses, low cost high resistant homes for families in Sri Lanka. In December 2009, Priyadarshi was felicitated as "Icon of Bihar" at the Bihar Conclave.  He is the youngest person to receive this honor.

Other activities 
Priyadarshi is a Tribeca Disruptive Fellow. He was a 2018 Fellow at the Center for Advanced Study in the Behavioral Sciences at Stanford University. He served as the founding member and director of the Vishwa Shanti Stupa (World Peace Pagoda Projects) in New Delhi and Sarnath (Varanasi), India.  He serves as trustee for The National Shrine of Saint Francis of Assisi and an advisor to the Renaissance Project in San Francisco, California. He is also actively involved in ongoing dialogue between Buddhism, meditation and neuroscience.

Media and publication 
Priyadarshi released an album of select Buddhist prayers in Sanskrit at the request of his students. The collection entitled "Revival: Sanskrit Buddhist Chants" was done in collaboration with a symphony in Mexico. Priyadarshi said "it was an impromptu fun collaboration to expose people to the power of Sanskrit language and chants. It has no entertainment value." This collection is now available on YouTube and other channels. Flutist and Musician Paul Horn said "The Venerable Tenzin Priyadarshi's soft powerful chanting, in a warm lush instrumental setting, offers a deep spiritual experience for the listener. A beautiful recording." Krishna Das adds "With a great depth of Devotion that is lit with Wisdom, Tenzin Priyadarshi creates a beautiful offering of Ancient Buddhist Prayers."

In 2020, Priyadarshi released his book "Running Toward Mystery: The Adventure of an Unconventional Life" with Random House US. Sting calls it "a necessary and captivating narrative of spiritual courage and truth seeking far beyond the veil of our contemporary delusions." Pulitzer Prize–winning author of The Emperor of All Maladies, Siddhartha Mukherjee says “Running Toward Mystery is not merely a book, but an experience, a biography, a formula for living, and a manifesto for a new kind of exploration of life. Tenzin Priyadarshi writes with the extraordinary conviction and grace that can only come from fulfillment. This book produces a kind of joy—and a nudge towards curiosity—that only few books can provide. It is, at the same time, a pathway and a journey. I could not put it down.”

References

External links 

 The Dalai Lama Center for Ethics and Transformative Values at MIT
 Tsunami Safe(r) Houses
 Prajnopaya
 Bodhimarga
 The website of Venerable Tenzin Priyadarshi
 Vishwa Shanti Stupa Project
 The National Shrine of Saint Fransis of Assisi

Tibetan Buddhist spiritual teachers
Rimé lamas
Tibetan Buddhists from India
People from Bihar
Living people
Year of birth missing (living people)
Massachusetts Institute of Technology faculty
Harvard University alumni
Le Moyne College alumni
Indian Buddhists
Indian chief executives